Category 5 hurricanes are tropical cyclones that reach Category 5 intensity on the Saffir–Simpson hurricane scale. They are by definition the strongest hurricanes that can form on planet Earth. They are rare in the northeastern Pacific Ocean and generally form only once every several years. In general, Category 5s form in clusters in single years. Landfalls by such storms are rare due to the generally westerly path of tropical cyclones in the Northern Hemisphere. The term "hurricane" is used for tropical cyclones in the Pacific Ocean, north of the equator and east of the International Date Line. A Category 5 Pacific hurricane is therefore a tropical cyclone in the north Pacific Ocean that reached Category 5 intensity east of the International Date Line. Identical phenomena in the north Pacific Ocean west of the dateline are called "typhoons" or "super typhoons". Category 5 super typhoons generally happen several times per season, so cyclones of that intensity are not exceptional for that region. This difference in terminology therefore excludes storms such as Typhoon Paka and Typhoon Oliwa of 1997, and Typhoon Genevieve of 2014, which formed east of the dateline but did not reach Category 5 intensity until after crossing the dateline.

Climatology and statistics

The majority of tropical cyclones form and organize in areas of warm sea surface temperatures, usually of at least  and low vertical wind shear; however, there are outliers to this general rule, such as storms that manage to intensify despite high amounts of vertical wind shear. When a pre-existing tropical disturbance – usually a tropical wave or a disturbance originating in the Intertropical Convergence Zone – enters an area where the aforementioned conditions are present, the disturbance can develop into a tropical cyclone, provided it is far enough from the equator to experience a sufficiently strong Coriolis force, which causes the counterclockwise rotation of hurricanes in the Northern Hemisphere. 

Between the months of December and April, sea surface temperatures in the tropics, where most Northeast Pacific tropical cyclones develop, are usually too low to support significant development. Also, the presence of a semi-permanent high-pressure area known as the North Pacific High in the eastern Pacific greatly reduces tropical cyclone development in the winter months, as the North Pacific High results in vertical wind shear that causes environmental conditions to be unconducive to tropical cyclone formation. Another factor preventing tropical cyclones from forming during the winter is the presence of a semi-permanent low-pressure area called the Aleutian Low between January and April. Its effects in the central Pacific near the 160th meridian west cause tropical waves that form in the area to move northward into the Gulf of Alaska. As the disturbances travel northward, they dissipate or transition into an extratropical cyclone. The Aleutian Low's retreat in late-April allows the warmth of the Pacific High to meander in, bringing its powerful clockwise wind circulation with it. During the month of May, the Intertropical Convergence Zone migrates southward while vertical shear over the tropics decreases. As a result, the earliest tropical waves begin to form, coinciding with the start of the eastern Pacific hurricane season on May 15. During summer and early autumn, sea surface temperatures rise further, reaching  in July and August, well above the  threshold for the formation and intensification of tropical cyclones. This allows for tropical cyclones developing during that time to strengthen significantly, perhaps even rapidly.

The El Niño–Southern Oscillation also influences the frequency and intensity of hurricanes in the Northeast Pacific basin. During El Niño events, sea surface temperatures increase in the Northeast Pacific and vertical wind shear decreases. Because of this, an increase in tropical cyclone activity occurs; the opposite happens in the Atlantic basin during El Niño, where increased wind shear creates an unfavorable environment for tropical cyclone formation. Contrary to El Niño, La Niña events increase wind shear and decreases sea surface temperatures over the eastern Pacific, while reducing wind shear and increasing sea surface temperatures over the Atlantic.

As a tropical cyclone is moving, its wind field is asymmetric. In the northern hemisphere, the strongest winds are on the right side of the storm (relative to the direction of motion). The highest winds given in advisories are those from the right side.

Since the 1959 season, only 18 hurricanes are known to have reached Category 5 intensity. There are no known Category 5 storms occurring before 1959. It is possible that some earlier storms reached Category 5 over open waters, but they were never recognized because they never affected land and remained at sea.

Category 5 Pacific hurricanes

This lists all of the Category 5 hurricanes in the order in which they formed. Only 1994's Hurricane Emilia and 2006's Hurricane Ioke have reached Category 5 intensity more than once; that is, by weakening into a Category 4 or weaker storm and later re-strengthening to a Category 5 storm.

Before the advent of reliable geostationary satellite coverage in 1966, the number of eastern Pacific tropical cyclones was significantly underestimated. It is therefore very possible that there are additional Category 5 hurricanes other than those listed, but they were not reported and therefore not recognized. However, the lack of Pacific Category 5 hurricanes during the late 1970s, 1980s, and early 1990s, is certain.

The minimum central pressure of these storms is, for the most part, estimated from satellite imagery using the Dvorak technique. In the case of Kenna, Ava, Patricia, and Lane, the central pressure was measured by hurricane hunter aircraft flying into the storm. Because of the estimation of central pressures, it is possible that other storms more intense than these have formed.

The reason for estimating the pressure (in lieu of direct measurements) is the fact that most of these storms did not threaten land. As Kenna, Patricia and Lane were threatening land, their pressures were measured by hurricane hunters using dropsondes. While Hurricane Ava never threatened land, it too was flown into by hurricane hunters to test equipment and conduct research.

Older storms have incomplete pressure readings, since there were no satellite-based estimates; the only observations were taken by ships, land-based observations, or reconnaissance aircraft when available. Ava's minimum known pressure was measured when it was a Category 4 hurricane, for example. John and Gilma have incomplete pressures because the Central Pacific Hurricane Center, in general, did not publish pressure on systems in the central Pacific (140°W to the dateline) at the time. This list is not identical to the list of most intense Pacific hurricanes. The most intense known Category 4 storm in the eastern Pacific was 2014's Odile.

Hurricanes have reached Category 5 intensity during every month from June to October. The earliest Category 5 to form in a season is 1973's Hurricane Ava, which formed on June 7. The latest Category 5 to form in a season is Hurricane Kenna, which reached peak intensity on October 24. Hurricanes Ava, Gilma, Ioke, Linda, and Patricia are the most intense storms to form in their respective months. There have been no May, November, or off-season Category 5 hurricanes.

Two Pacific hurricanes are known to have reached Category 5 intensity multiple times: Emilia and Ioke. Both did it twice, and Ioke reached Category 5 status a third time as a typhoon while in the western Pacific. Hurricane Ioke was tied for the longest-lasting Category 5 hurricane recorded, spending 42 hours at that strength, while hurricanes John and Linda had the longest time spent consecutively at that intensity.

Landfalls

Of all of the Category 5 Pacific hurricanes, the only ones to make landfall at any intensity were Hurricane Kenna, Hurricane Rick, Hurricane Patricia, and Hurricane Willa. None made landfall as Category 5 hurricanes; Patricia and Kenna had weakened to Category 4 status at the time of their landfalls, Willa had weakened to Category 3, and Rick was a tropical storm at its landfall. Patricia was the strongest at landfall among Pacific hurricanes; 1976's Hurricane Madeline and 1992's Hurricane Iniki are tied as the second-strongest storms at landfall, both of which did not reach Category 5 strength, but made landfall as stronger Category 4 storms than Kenna. Originally, a hurricane in 1959 was thought to have struck Manzanillo at Category 5 intensity, but a reanalysis in 2016 indicated the storm had peaked as a Category 4 hurricane, and made landfall with the same sustained wind speed as Kenna.

In addition to these four systems, hurricanes John, Linda, Ioke, Lane, and Walaka all threatened land at some point during their existence. John, Ioke and Walaka had minimal impacts on Johnston Atoll, John caused heavy surf in Hawaii, and Walaka passed close to East Island in the French Frigate Shoals. Linda was briefly forecast to approach southern California, and it passed close to Socorro Island near peak intensity.

The reason for the lack of landfalls is that tropical cyclones in the northern hemisphere usually travel to the west. Within the Northeast Pacific, the easterly trade winds cause tropical cyclones to generally move westward out into the open Pacific Ocean. Only rarely do tropical cyclones forming during the peak months of the season make landfall. Closer to the end of the season, the subtropical ridge steers some storms northwards or northeastwards. Storms influenced by this ridge may bring impacts to the western coasts of Mexico and occasionally even Central America. In the central Pacific basin, the North Pacific High keeps tropical cyclones away from the Hawaiian Islands by forcing them southwards. Combined with cooler waters around the Hawaiian Islands that tend to weaken tropical cyclones that approach them, this makes direct impacts on the Hawaiian Islands by tropical cyclones rare.

See also

List of tropical cyclones
List of the most intense tropical cyclones
Pacific hurricane season
List of Category 5 Atlantic hurricanes
List of Eastern Pacific tropical storms
List of Category 1 Pacific hurricanes
List of Category 2 Pacific hurricanes
List of Category 3 Pacific hurricanes
List of Category 4 Pacific hurricanes
List of F5 and EF5 tornadoes

References

 
Category 5
Pacific 5